Mark Buckley (born September 1, 1960) is a former professional tennis player from the United States.

Biography
Buckley was born in Bogalusa, Louisiana and attended the University of Alabama, before competing on the professional tennis tour in the 1980s

Ranked as high as 124 in singles, he won one Challenger title, at Bergen in 1986. 

Most notably he reached the second round of the 1987 French Open. After beating Jaime Yzaga in the first round, he took second seed Boris Becker to four sets in a second round loss.

Challenger titles

Singles: (1)

References

External links
 
 

1960 births
Living people
American male tennis players
Tennis people from Louisiana
People from Bogalusa, Louisiana
Alabama Crimson Tide men's tennis players